Haidian Subdistrict is one of the 22 subdistricts inside of Haidian District, Beijing, China. It is on the south of Haidian District, shares border with Wanliu Area and Yanyuan Subdistrict in its north, Zhongguancun Subdistrict in its east, Zizhuyuan Subdistrict in its south, and Shuguang Subdistrict in its west. As of 2020, it was home to 123,191 residents.

History 
This area was first organized into Haidian Town in 1949, and then converted to a subdistrict in 1954.

Administrative Divisions 
In the year 2021, there were 32 communities within Haidian Subdistrict:

See also 

 List of township-level divisions of Beijing

References 

Haidian District
Subdistricts of Beijing